The Hospital del Salvador is a hospital in central Santiago, Chile. The hospital is located in the commune of Providencia.

History 

The hospital was founded on December 7, 1871, during the presidency of Federico Errázuriz Zañartu, in response to the high number of deaths caused by epidemics in Santiago.  The foundation stone was laid on the site of the former Mercedarian convent on January 1, 1872. Construction was delayed by economic problems and by the War of the Pacific (1879–84). In 1888 a new hospital was designed by the architect Carlos Barroilhet, it was approved four years later.

Part of the hospital facade was destroyed by the 1985 Chile earthquake, this was soon repaired. Also in 1985, the main facade, the chapel, the buildings, halls and the park within the building complex were declared as historical monuments.

The hospital's ophthalmic trauma unit treated the majority of the eye injuries during 2019–2020 Chilean protests. On October 21, 2019, a record twenty patients with eye injuries arrived at the hospital, ten within one hour.

References

Salvador
Hospitals established in 1871
Buildings and structures in Santiago Metropolitan Region
1871 establishments in Chile